, internal designation o5m72, is a distant resonant trans-Neptunian object on an eccentric orbit in the outermost region of the Solar System, approximately  in diameter. It was first observed on 21 May 2015 by astronomers with the Outer Solar System Origins Survey at the Mauna Kea Observatories on the island of Hawaii, United States. Its existence was first released in February 2018, and the observations and orbit were announced on 27 April 2018. It belongs to the most distant resonant objects known to exist.

Description 

 is one of two known resonant trans-Neptunian objects that stay in a distant 1:9 resonance with the ice giant Neptune. They are currently the most distant resonant objects known with a secure resonant classification, and their detection allowed to estimate a 1:9-resonant population of 11 thousand objects with similar orbits and similar size. It is thought that both objects originated from the scattered disc before they became locked into a mean-motion resonance with Neptune. 

Based on a generic magnitude-to-diameter conversion, the object measures 100 kilometers in diameter, for an absolute magnitude of 8.2, and an assumed albedo of 0.09, which is a typical figure seen among the diverse populations of distant objects.

It orbits the Sun at a distance of 44.1–222 AU once every 1536 years (semi-major axis of 133.1 AU). Its orbit has a high eccentricity of 0.67 and an inclination of 38° with respect to the ecliptic. As of 2018, this minor planet has not been numbered.

References

External links 
 List Of Centaurs and Scattered-Disk Objects, Minor Planet Center
 List of Transneptunian Objects, Minor Planet Center
 How many dwarf planets are there in the outer solar system?, Michael Brown
 List of Known Trans-Neptunian Objects, Johnston's Archive
 

Trans-Neptunian objects in a 1:9 resonance
Minor planet object articles (unnumbered)
Discoveries by OSSOS
20150521